Star Tonight, an American television anthology series, aired on ABC from February 3, 1955, to August 1956. It consisted of 80 total episodes, 30 from 1955 and 50 from 1956. Each episode was a self-contained story, usually adapted from famous plays, short-stories or novels by some of the writers of the day.

Harry Herrmann produced the program, which replaced So You Want to Lead a Band. It was sponsored by the Brillo Manufacturing Company.

Episode list, partial
February 3, 1955, "You Need Me"; with Jacqueline Holt, Kevin McCarthy 
February 10, 1955, "The Week-end"; with Darryl Grimes, John Conte, Peg Hillias
February 17, 1955, "Concerning Death"
February 24, 1955 "How Beautiful the Shoes"
March 3, 1955, "Zone of Quiet"
March 10, 1955, "Ile"
...

Notable guest stars
Theodore BikelLeo G. CarrollBuster CrabbeRobert CulpRichard DavalosSigne HassoKim HunterJune LockhartNancy MaloneKevin McCarthyJason RobardsLois SmithRudy ValleeJo Van FleetElizabeth Wilson
Joanne WoodwardEfrem Zimbalist Jr

References

External links
Star Tonight at CVTA with episode list

1955 American television series debuts
1956 American television series endings
1950s American anthology television series
American Broadcasting Company original programming
1950s American drama television series
Black-and-white American television shows
English-language television shows